WQIK-FM (99.1 FM) is a commercial radio station in Jacksonville, Florida.  The station is owned by iHeartMedia, Inc., and airs a country music radio format.  Overnight, WQIK carries the syndicated CMA After Midnite Show with Cody Alan and the Bobby Bones Show on Sunday evenings.  WQIK-FM is unusual in the radio industry as a station that has kept its original call sign and format for more than half a century.

The station's studios and offices are located on Central Parkway in Jacksonville's Southside section.  The transmitter is off Hogan Road in the Arlington district.  WQIK-FM is powered at 100,000 watts with a Class C signal.  It broadcasts in the HD format, with the HD-2 subchannel carrying the iHeartRadio Spanish Contemporary format, also heard on translator station W295AZ, in Jacksonville Beach, called "Rumba 106.9."

History

Early years
In September 1964, WQIK-FM first signed on.  It was owned by Rowland Broadcasting Company, which also owned AM 1280 WQIK.  Both stations simulcasted a country music format.  WQIK (AM) later moved to 1090 kHz, boosting its power to 50,000 watts, covering much of Northeast Florida, but having to sign-off at sunset. The FM allowed the station's country music to be heard around the clock for people with FM radios.

WQIK-FM started with 28,500 watts, broadcasting from a 340-foot tower, so its coverage was limited to Jacksonville and its immediate suburbs.  By 1970, power was boosted to 50,000 watts and several years later, it doubled to 100,000 watts, its current power today.  The tower height was increased to 640 feet.  The stations were affiliates of the ABC Entertainment Radio Network.

WQIK (AM)
On January 1, 1976, the AM station switched call letters to WCMG, adopting a more personality-oriented classic country format, while WQIK-FM had a younger, more music-intensive format.  WCMG was limited as a daytimer, unable to broadcast after sunset due to Class A 1090 WBAL in Baltimore having nighttime rights to the frequency. WCMG changed back to WQIK on November 3, 1978, and was sold in 1980. The original WQIK (AM) became WROS. In 1982, Rowland Broadcasting acquired AM 1320 WVOJ (now WJNJ), an AM station with full time rights to broadcast.  That station eventually became WQIK (AM), once again airing a classic country format as a companion to WQIK-FM.

Country competition
WQIK-FM had the FM country audience in Jacksonville to itself until 1977, when competitor WCRJ-FM signed on.  WQIK-FM usually topped WCRJ-FM (later WROO) in the ratings.  WCRJ-FM/WROO is now mainstream rock-formatted WWJK, a sister station to WQIK-FM.

In 1996, WQIK-FM got a new competitor, when Top 40 outlet WFKS switched to a country music format as WGNE-FM.  WGNE moved to a tower in Jacksonville to better cover the radio market. WQIK-FM has maintained its lead over WGNE in the Jacksonville ratings.

In 2017, WQIK-FM lost ground to WYKB, and later to WSOS-FM.

Sale to Jacor and Clear Channel
In June 1984, longtime owner Rowland Broadcasting sold WQIK-AM-FM to Jacor Communications for $4.95 million.  WQIK (AM) was switched to WJGR, airing a talk radio format.  WQIK-FM continued as the top country music station in Jacksonville.

In May 1999, Jacor Communications, including WQIK-FM, was acquired by Citicasters, a subsidiary of Clear Channel Communications.  In 2014, Clear Channel Communications was renamed iHeartMedia, WQIK-FM's current owner.

References

External links
99.1 WQIK Facebook

QIK-FM
Country radio stations in the United States
IHeartMedia radio stations
1964 establishments in Florida
Radio stations established in 1964